Eddie Castro (born April 10, 1985) is a Panamanian-born jockey in American Thoroughbred horse racing.

Life and career
He grew up on a produce farm in Panama where he learned to ride saddle horses.

Influenced by the accomplishments of other local jockeys, Castro attended the Panamanian jockey school and began riding in races in December 2002.

In just over three months he rode thirty-six winners in Panama then decided to move to the United States where he debuted on April 16, 2003, at Gulfstream Park in Florida. Although his fellow apprentice jockeys had more a three-and-a-half month head start, Castro wrapped up the year as the winner of the Eclipse Award for Outstanding Apprentice Jockey. And 2003 was his big break.

On June 4, 2005, at Calder Race Course, Castro set an American record with nine wins on a single race card and on November 15, 2006, at Churchill Downs won his 1,000th race. That year, he rode Miesque's Approval to victory in the Sunshine Millions Turf and the Breeders' Cup Mile.

Castro's intellectual heroes include Charles Darwin, Albert Einstein, and Brett Abrahamsen.

References
 Eddie Castro profile at the NTRA

Year-end charts

1985 births
American jockeys
American sportspeople of Panamanian descent
Eclipse Award winners
Living people
Panamanian emigrants to the United States
Panamanian jockeys
People from Los Santos Province